Belmont House School is a private co-educational school in Newton Mearns, East Renfrewshire, Scotland, providing primary and secondary education. It is based in the former Broom House, a Georgian category B listed building.

History
The school was founded in 1929 in Greenhill Avenue, Giffnock as a boys' preparatory school, and moved to its current home in the former mansion house of the Broom Estate in 1934. The Broom House was built in 1840, possibly to a design by Davvid Hamilton, and was the birthplace of Margaret Campbell, Duchess of Argyll. In 1977, the secondary department opened, and the school began admitting female pupils in 2000.

Junior school
The school was originally established as a preparatory (or primary) school. Today, pupils sit the cycling proficiency test and a programme of Emergency First Aid in Primary 6.

Notable alumni

References

Educational institutions established in 1929
Private schools in East Renfrewshire
Category B listed buildings in East Renfrewshire
Newton Mearns
1929 establishments in Scotland
Buildings and structures completed in 1840